Fort Sanders was a wooden fort constructed in 1866 on the Laramie Plains in southern Wyoming, near the city of Laramie. Originally named Fort John Buford, it was renamed Fort Sanders after General William P. Sanders, who died at the Siege of Knoxville during the American Civil War. This was the second fort to be named after Sanders, the first being in Knoxville, Tennessee. The fort was originally intended to protect travelers on the nearby Overland Trail from Indian attacks, but later the garrison was tasked with protecting the workers of the Union Pacific railroad when it arrived in the spring of 1868. Fort Sanders became less important following the construction of Fort D. A. Russell in Cheyenne in 1868, but the War Department maintained it until 1882 when the buildings were sold.

Layout 

The post was originally built for four companies, but was later expanded to accommodate six. Nearly all of the buildings were constructed of wood except for the stone guardhouse, which was built in 1869 and remains the only structure standing on the original site today. At least two additional buildings from the fort were moved to other locations in Laramie and survive today. The post Commander's quarters were moved to LaBonte Park and have been used as community center, and since 2010 the headquarters of the nonprofit food access organization Feeding Laramie Valley. Another building became the Cavalrymen Supper Club.

See also
 List of the oldest buildings in Wyoming

References

External links 
 L.C. Bishop, "Emigrant Trail Map Series: Fort Sanders", 1959
 Fort Sanders Guardhouse at the Wyoming State Historic Preservation Office

Sanders
Pre-statehood history of Wyoming
Buildings and structures in Albany County, Wyoming
Sanders
National Register of Historic Places in Albany County, Wyoming